The 2008–09 season is the sixth in the history of the Scarlets regional side. The season will see the Scarlets compete in three competitions: the Celtic League, the EDF Energy Cup and the Heineken Cup. The season welcomes a change of ground, with the team moving from their home of over 125 years, Stradey Park, to a new stadium in Pemberton named Parc y Scarlets, as well as a change in the team name, dropping the "Llanelli" from their moniker to become the Scarlets.

Pre-season and friendlies

Celtic League
The Scarlets opened their 2008-09 Celtic League season away to Ulster on 5 September 2008. Despite playing against the wind in the first half, the Scarlets scored an early penalty in the sixth minute, before Darren Daniel scored the first try of the game, crossing in the corner. Clinton Schifcofske scored three penalties in response to make the half-time score 10–9 to the visitors. The Scarlets then took full advantage of the wind in the second half, Stephen Jones putting over two penalties to put the result beyond doubt. The Scarlets' next match came five days later, when they travelled to Rodney Parade to take on the Newport Gwent Dragons. The game looked out of the Llanelli side's reach at half time, as they trailed 25–6, but two unanswered tries from Martin Roberts and Nathan Brew, a conversion and two further penalties from Stephen Jones pulled the score back to 25–24. Brew came close to putting the Scarlets into the lead with 11 minutes to go, but fumbled the ball before he could get to the line, while Stephen Jones put an easy drop goal wide moments later. Fortunately for him, after Robert Lewis conceded a penalty in front of the posts, Jones finally gave the Scarlets a two-point win with three minutes left to play.

The team's next game came just three days later, at home to Connacht in the first of their final three games at Stradey Park. The Irish side opened the scoring with a penalty in the first minute, but those were to be their only points of the match as the Scarlets tore through the Connacht defence seemingly at will. Both Morgan Stoddart and Dafydd James broke the Connacht line before Deacon Manu scored the first try of the game, and then an almost identical one soon after to make the score 12–3 going into half-time. Two more tries came soon after the break, from Jonathan Davies and Nathan Brew, securing the try bonus point for the Scarlets. Man of the match Morgan Stoddart added two more before the end, with his tries separated by one from Mark Jones, to end the final Celtic League game at Stradey Park with a 45–3 win for the home side.

The Scarlets unbeaten start to the season came to an end on 19 September when they travelled to Scotland to play Edinburgh, losing 32–12. The loss meant that the Scarlets' run of being the only team not to beat Edinburgh at Murrayfield continued. It took 26 minutes before the first try came for Edinburgh, and it was not long before they added a second. They could have had a third just before half time, but Mark Robertson knocked on in the in-goal area attempting to gather a bouncing ball. The third eventually did come, however, as did a fourth before the midpoint of the second half. A Morgan Stoddart try was sandwiched between Edinburgh's two second half scores, and Martin Roberts crossed with a minute left to play, but it was too little, too late for the Scarlets. They then suffered a second defeat to a Scottish team in as many weeks with a 34–20 loss to Glasgow Warriors on 26 September. Despite taking a 12–0 lead in the first quarter of the match, the Scarlets found themselves 13–12 down at half-time and conceded another two tries before the 60 minute mark. Mark Jones scored a consolation try with eight minutes to go, but it was nullified by a last minute Glasgow try.

After a two-month break for the EDF Energy Cup, the Heineken Cup and the Autumn internationals, the Scarlets restarted their Celtic League campaign with a home game against Munster on 28 November 2008, their first match at their new stadium, Parc y Scarlets. The two sides exchanged a penalty each in the first quarter of the game, but it was Munster who scored the first try at the ground, Ian Dowling crossing in the 33rd minute. Denis Leamy then scored a converted try shortly before half-time, making the score 15–3 to the Irish at the interval. The second half was largely uneventful until the Scarlets made a late resurgence, being awarded a penalty try in injury time at the end of the game. However, it was not enough to overturn the Munster lead, the match finishing 18–16 to Munster.

Pld = Matches played; W = Matches won; D = Matches drawn; L = Matches lost; F = Points for; A = Points against; PD = Points difference; BP = Bonus points; Pts = Points

EDF Energy Cup
The Scarlets kicked off their 2008–09 EDF Energy Cup campaign with a 26–17 win away to Saracens on 5 October 2008. Australian Number 8 David Lyons opened the scoring for the Llanelli side, but Saracens responded almost immediately with two converted tries. However, the Scarlets took a 16–14 half-time lead through the boot of Stephen Jones. Saracens retook the lead soon after the break, but a Kees Meeuws try in the 48th minute secured the win for the Scarlets, while Stephen Jones denied the English side a losing bonus point with a penalty in the 63rd minute.

On 24 October 2008, the Scarlets hosted Bristol for the last ever competitive match to be held at Stradey Park. The home side got off to a perfect start, with Morgan Stoddart crossing the try line after just two minutes. Following lengthy analysis by the Television Match Official, Simon Easterby was awarded a try just before half-time, to take the score to 17–0 going into half time. A Stephen Jones penalty 10 minutes into the second half made it 20–0, before former Bristol centre Rob Higgitt scored to effectively put the result beyond doubt. The remainder of the match was spent with the Scarlets seeking the one try that would have given them the bonus point win, but it never came, and they had to be content with a 27–0 whitewash. The result put them in pole position to qualify for the semi-finals, although Northampton were still to play both Saracens and the Scarlets themselves.

Saracens beat Northampton that Sunday, meaning that the Scarlets needed only to avoid defeat to Northampton to qualify for the semi-finals. The match was played at Franklin's Gardens on the Saturday of the following weekend, and started at a blistering pace, with Regan King and Morgan Stoddart scoring tries in the first ten minutes. Northampton hit back immediately through Chris Ashton, who added another in the 29th minute. Ashton's two tries, in addition to a penalty for each side, meant that the half-time score was 13–13. Northampton started the second half the brighter of the two sides, and they took the lead for the first time when Bruce Reihana scored a converted try in the 45th minute. They stretched their lead midway through the half, through Sean Lamont and the boot of Stephen Myler, and, although they suffered a yellow card to James Downey, they held off a Scarlet resurgence to win 33–20 and qualify for the semi-finals.

Heineken Cup

Squad statistics

Transfers

In

Out

References

2008-09
2008–09 Celtic League by team
2008–09 in Welsh rugby union
2008–09 Heineken Cup by team